Die Architekten is an East German film directed by Peter Kahane. It was released in 1990.

Plot
Daniel Brenner is an architect in his late thirties. Despite a top university degree, he has to spend his professional life with bus shelters and telephone booths. Then he receives the appealing commission to design a cultural center for a satellite town. Brenner accepts under the condition that he will be allowed to select his own team. Their plan to create a non-conventional construction fails. His wife and their common daughter leave the country for West Germany. Broken and disillusioned, Brenner collapses in front of the project's inauguration tribune.

Cast

Music
The music was written by Tamas Kahane. The film's songs counterpoint its images: Unsere Heimat is added to scenes of urban canyons, the Berlin Wall, industrial complexes and prefabricated housing developments. The protagonist collapses to the tunes of Handel's Messiah.

Reception
With less than 6,000 tickets sold, the film received scant attention at the time of release. In retrospect it is considered a significant cineastic contribution to the country's time of transition.

References

1990 films
Films set in Berlin
East German films
1990s German-language films
1990s German films